The short-billed dowitcher (Limnodromus griseus), like its congener the long-billed dowitcher, is a medium-sized, stocky, long-billed shorebird in the family Scolopacidae.

It is an inhabitant of North America, Central America, the Caribbean, and northern South America. It is strongly migratory; it completely vacates in breeding areas during the snow-bound months. This species favors a variety of habitats including tundra in the north to ponds and mudflats in the south. It feeds on invertebrates often by rapidly probing its bill into mud in a sewing machine fashion. It and the very similar long-billed dowitcher were considered one species until 1950. Field identification of the two American Limnodromus remains difficult today. Distinguishing wintering or juvenile short-billed dowitchers from the long-billed species is very difficult and, even given examination their subtlety different body shapes, cannot always be isolated to a particular species. They differ most substantially in vocalizations. The names of American dowitchers are misleading, as there is much overlap in their bill lengths. Only a small percentage can be identified by this character alone.

Taxonomy
The short-billed dowitcher was formally described in 1789 by the German naturalist Johann Friedrich Gmelin in his revised and expanded edition of Carl Linnaeus's Systema Naturae. He placed it in the genus Scolopax and coined the binomial name Scolopax grisea. Gmelin based his description on the "brown snipe" from the coast of New York that had been described in 1785 by the English ornithologist John Latham and by the Welsh naturalist Thomas Pennant. The short-billed dowitcher is now placed in the genus Limnodromus that was introduced in 1833 by Prince Maximilian of Wied-Neuwied. The genus name combines the Ancient Greek limnē meaning "marsh" with -dromos meaning "-racer" or "-runner". The specific griseus is Medieval Latin meaning "grey".  The English name "dowitcher" is from Iroquois and was first recorded in 1841.

Three subspecies are recognised:
 L. g. caurinus Pitelka, 1950 – Breeds: Gulf of Alaska and inland central-south Alaska, southwest Yukon and montane northwest British Columbia (northwest Canada). Winters: central USA to Peru 
 L. g. hendersoni Rowan, 1932 – Breeds: central-north Alberta to west Manitoba (central Canada). Winters: southeast USA to Panama
 L. g. griseus (Gmelin, JF, 1789) – Breeds: southwest Hudson Bay and James Bay to west Labrador (central-east Canada). Winters: south USA to Brazil

Description
The body of adults is dark brown on top and reddish underneath. The tail has a black and white barred pattern. The legs are a yellowish color.

The three subspecies have slight variations in appearance:
 L. g. griseus has a white belly and barred flanks.
 L. g. hendersoni has a reddish belly and spotted flanks.
 L. g. caurinus has a white belly with heavily barred flanks and densely spotted breast.

None of these combines the reddish belly and barred flanks of the breeding plumage long-billed dowitcher. The winter plumage is largely grey.

The call of this bird is more mellow than that of the long-billed dowitcher, and is useful in identification, particularly of the difficult adult plumages.

Distribution and habitat
The breeding habitat of the short-billed dowitcher includes bogs, tidal marshes, mudflats or forest clearings south of the tree line in northern North America. L. g. griseus breeds in northern Quebec; L. g. hendersoni breeds in north central Canada; L. g. caurinus breeds in southern Alaska and southern Yukon.

The birds migrate to the southern United States and as far south as Brazil. This bird is more likely to be seen near ocean coasts during migration than the long-billed dowitcher. This species occurs in western Europe only as an extremely rare vagrant.

Behavior and ecology

Breeding
These birds nest on the ground, usually near water. Their nests are shallow depressions in clumps of grass or moss, which are lined with fine grasses, twigs and leaves. They lay four, sometimes three, olive-buff to brown eggs. Incubation lasts for 21 days and is done by both sexes.

The downy juvenile birds leave the nest soon after hatching. Parental roles are not well known, but it is believed the female departs and leaves the male to tend the chicks, which find all their own food.

Food and feeding
These birds forage by probing in shallow water or on wet mud. They mainly eat insects, mollusks, crustaceans and marine worms, but also eat some plant material.

References

External links
 Short-billed Dowitcher - Limnodromus griseus - USGS Patuxent Bird Identification InfoCenter
 Short-billed dowitcher species account - Cornell Lab of Ornithology
 
 Short-billed dowitcher, Cape Jourimain Nature Centre
 
 
 

Limnodromus
Native birds of Alaska
Birds of Canada
Birds of Hispaniola
Birds of the Dominican Republic
Shorebirds
Birds described in 1789
Taxa named by Johann Friedrich Gmelin